Citizens for Europe is a community of over 500 civil society organizations (CSOs) committed to a participative, diverse and democratic Europe. Since its founding in 2010, Citizens for Europe has been committed to strengthening civil society actors in their structures. The initiators of this network aim to use cooperation incentives to create synergies between CSOs, thereby strengthening civil society in Europe.

History 
As one of the initiators the Fondation Charles Léopold Meyer pour le Progrès de l’homme provides monetary and networking support to the community. However, the decision-making body is the Core Team. The group consists of grant makers and grantees who carry the project and collectively decide about any support given. The Core Team consists of a heterogeneous group of dedicated activists with diverse expertise from different organizations and engagement areas.

It is important to note that CFEU itself does not have a legal structure. The deliberate decision not to build up a legal structure came from the conviction that innovation thrives best in an environment of co-dependencies. Sharing administrative tasks provides a system of checks and balances that allows for more transparency and ownership in the project than a single legal body could provide. Therefore, as a funding network CFEU relies on strategic partner organisations such as the European Movement International to fulfil some administrative tasks and a small team of paid staff, a Program Manager and a Network Coordinator, to maintain operations.

Work 
Today, CFEU is a civil society infrastructure that specializes in

1) networking and thematic exchange for a community of CSOs as well as

2) awarding of seed funding for projects with democratic innovation potential.

Among other projects, the support to the community includes campaigns for voting rights for third-country nationals in Germany, discussions on women in politics in France, or online projects to analyze voting behavior in the European Parliament in Brussels. The strategy of supporting CSOs in building their work structures and making them strong and independent players will continue to be the goal of CFEU.

References

External links
Citizens for Europe
The Charles Léopold Mayer Foundation for the Progress of Humankind

European culture